Kolaambi  is an Indian Malayalam-language drama film written and directed by T. K. Rajeev Kumar, starring Nithya Menen, Renji Panicker, Rohini, Sijoy Varghese and Dileesh Pothan. The film is produced by Roopesh Omana under the production house Nirmalyam Cinema. Resul Pookutty handles the sound recording, while music is composed by Ramesh Narayan and cinematography is done by Ravi Varman. Production design is done by Sabu Cyril.

Kolaambi was selected in Indian Panorama, at 50th International Film Festival of India, Goa, held from 20 November to 28. It was premiered at the festival. The film was released on 24 December 2021.

Cast 

 Nithya Menon as Arundhati
 Renji Panicker as Abdul Khader
 Dileesh Pothan as Sudharshan
 Sijoy Varghese as Sanjay Tharakan
 Rohini as Sundarambal
 Siddharth Menon as Solomon
 Baiju Santhosh as Moulavi
 Aristo Suresh as Aampli Naanu
 Suresh Kumar as Varghese
 Manju Pillai as Lawyer
 Asha Aravind as Anju Sudharshan
 P. Balachandran as Kamal Pasha
 Pauly Valsan as Alphonse
 Jayakrishnan as Jacob George
 Poojapura Radhakrishan as Beeran
 Vijay Yesudas as himself (cameo appearance)

Production
Kolaambi marks the 25th film and directorial come back of director T. K Rajeev Kumar after nearly six years. Resul Pookutty was brought in for sound recording. Ravi Varman was signed as the cinematographer and Sabu Cyril as the production designer. Nithya Menen was chosen for the role of biennale artist, marking her second collaboration with T. K. Rajeev Kumar after Thalsamayam Oru Penkutty.

Principal photography of the film was commenced at Thiruvananthapuram on 18 October 2018.

Soundtrack

Accolades

References

External links 
 

2019 films
Indian musical drama films
Films shot in Thiruvananthapuram
2010s Malayalam-language films
2010s musical drama films
2019 drama films
Films directed by T. K. Rajeev Kumar